Mohamed Hatem Ben Salem is a Tunisian politician. He was the Minister of Education under former President Zine El Abidine Ben Ali.

Biography
Hatem Ben Salem was born on 8 February 1956. He received a PhD in Law from the University of Paris and the agrégation from the Tunis University.

From 1996 to 2000, he was the Tunisian Ambassador to Senegal, then Guinea, Gambia, Cap Vert, Turkey, and then to the United Nations in Geneva.

He is a member of the International Institute for Strategic Studies in London and the International Institute of Human Rights in Strasbourg.  He has taught at Lund University in Sweden and the University of Graz in Austria. In 2008, he was appointed as Minister of Education, until he was deposed in the aftermath of the 2010–2011 Tunisian protests. On 6 July 2015, Ben Salem was appointed as Director of the Tunisian Institute for Strategic Studies. In 2017, Hatem Ben Salem was appointed for the second time as Minister of Education of the Republic of Tunisia.

References

1956 births
University of Paris alumni
Tunis University alumni
Government ministers of Tunisia
Academic staff of Lund University
Academic staff of the University of Graz
Living people
Ambassadors of Tunisia to Senegal
Ambassadors of Tunisia to Guinea
Ambassadors of Tunisia to the Gambia
Ambassadors of Tunisia to Turkey
Permanent Representatives of Tunisia to the United Nations
20th-century Tunisian people
21st-century Tunisian people
Tunisian expatriates in France